The A-I-R Atos is a German high-wing, single-place, rigid wing hang glider designed by Felix Ruehle and produced by A-I-R GmbH of Halblech.

Design and development
The Atos was originally designed as a competition rigid wing hang glider in 1998, with production commencing the following year. Since then the design has undergone almost continuous refinement and a succession of model numbers. It remained in production in 2012.

The aircraft structure is made from carbon-fiber-reinforced polymer. The wing uses minimal cable bracing and incorporates both flaps and spoilers for roll control. The aspect ratio for most models is in the range of 11:1 or 12:1. Achieved glide ratios run as high as 20:1. Later models incorporate a horizontal tailplane for improved stability.

The Atos gliders are designed for folding for ground transportation. The largest model, the Atos VX, for example, can be folded into 5.80 x 0.48 x 0.20m (19.0 x 1.57 x 0.66 feet) in 18 minutes and weighs .

Later model Atos are compatible with the Swedish Aerosport Mosquito power pack.

The wing was also later developed into an ultralight trike, the Ultralight Design Atos Trike. It can also be fitted to the Veleria Dedalo Strike-T trike.

Operational history
The Atos series have been flown in the rigid wing class in World Hang Gliding Championships since 1999 and have won titles on many occasions.

Variants
Atos C 135
DHV certification.
Atos C 160
DHV certification.
Atos C Classique 135
DHV certification.
Atos C Classique 160
DHV certification.
Atos C+ 135
DHV certification.
Atos C+ 160
DHV certification.
Atos VS
DHV certification.
Atos V
DHV certification.
Atos VQ
DHV certification.
Atos VR/VR10
DHV certification.
Atos VX
The VX is certified under DHV for two-place operations.

Specifications (Atos VX)

References

External links

Hang gliders